Mortimer West End is a village and civil parish in north Hampshire in England. It lies in the northernmost point of the county.

History
At one time it was the Hampshire part of the cross-county parish of Stratfield Mortimer (mostly in Berkshire). It became an independent ecclesiastical parish in 1870 - the church of St Saviour having been built in 1854 - and a civil parish in 1894. The parish was transferred from the county of Berkshire to the county of Hampshire in 1879, producing the slight bulge in Hampshire's northern boundary.

Amenities
The village is served by a public house, the Red Lion, which is now an Italian Gastropub.

Transport
There is a village link minibus service which serves Pamber Heath, Silchester and Mortimer West End. It is necessary to pre-book this service by contacting Hampshire County Council.

Calleva Atrebatum
The village is very close to the site of Calleva Atrebatum which mostly lies in the parish of Silchester. The remains of the town's amphitheatre, however, lie within Mortimer West End, and the Roman road running from Silchester northwards through the village can still be made out in parts. A short stretch of Roman road is still in use in the hamlet of Aldermaston Soke.

References

External links

Royal Berkshire History: Stratfield Mortimer
Mortimer West End Cricket Club
St. Saviour's C of E Church

Villages in Hampshire
Civil parishes in Basingstoke and Deane